Papetti is an Italian surname. Notable people with the surname include:

 Alessandro Papetti (born 1958), Italian painter
 Andrea Papetti (born 2002), Italian professional footballer
 Fausto Papetti (1923 – 1999), Italian alto saxophone player
 Pietro Papetti (born 1999), Italian ice dancer

See also 

 Panetti

Italian-language surnames